The Kanglang fish (Anabarilius grahami) is a species of cyprinid fish. It is a pelagic species endemic to Fuxian Lake in Yunnan, southern China. However, the species may now be in the process of extinction because of the introduced noodlefish Neosalanx taihuensis, with which it is competing for food.

References

External links
 

Anabarilius
Endemic fauna of Yunnan
Freshwater fish of China
Fish described in 1908
Taxa named by Charles Tate Regan